Michael Randolph Jr. (born November 18, 1999) is an American professional basketball player for UCC Demons of the Irish Super League. He played college basketball for the Florida A&M Rattlers of the Southwestern Athletic Conference (SWAC).

High school career
Randolph moved to Pensacola, Florida at the age of seven. He attended Booker T. Washington High School. Randolph was named Pensacola News Journal All-Area three times. He hit the game-winning three-pointer in an 69–67 victory over Pensacola High School in January 2018, finishing with 27 points. Randolph averaged 21.4 points, 6.7 rebounds and 3.8 steals per game as a senior. He committed to play college basketball at Florida A&M.

College career
As a freshman, Randolph averaged 7.2 points, 3.9 rebounds and 1.7 assists.per game and was named MEAC rookie of the week six times. He averaged 13.0 points, 5.8 rebounds and 1.8 steals per game as a sophomore. As a junior, Randolph averaged 15.3 points, 6.4 rebounds, and 4.4 assists per game, earning First Team All-MEAC honors. On December 17, 2021, he scored a career-high 31 points in an 80–66 loss to Santa Clara. He was named SWAC player of the week five times as a senior and had two double-doubles. At the close of the regular season, Randolph was named SWAC Player of the Year. He averaged 18.9 points, 6.2 rebounds, 3.7 assists and two steals per game.

Professional career
In December 2022, Randolph signed with UCC Demons in Ireland for the rest of the 2022–23 Super League season. He was named the league's Player of the Month for December after averaging 34.7 points per game in three wins, which included a 38-point game. He was named Player of the Month for February as well.

References

External links
 Florida A&M Rattlers bio

1999 births
Living people
American expatriate basketball people in Ireland
American men's basketball players
Basketball players from Florida
Florida A&M Rattlers basketball players
Sportspeople from Pensacola, Florida
Shooting guards